The Protpittayapayat School is a public high school in Bangkok, Thailand.

History 
On 1 August 1949, Protpittayapayat School was established as a public high school in Lat Krabang District. The first building on the grounds was a house belonging to Lady Liam, who donated the land for educational purposes. The other buildings consist of two primary schools, a high school, and two universities.  The school was named in honour of Lady Liam's late husband, Professor Propittayapayat.

Programs 
 Science – Math
 Arts – Math
 Arts – French
 Arts – Chinese
 Thai – social
 Science - Sport
 Business - Technology

Gallery

References

External links
  
 ProtSocialHub  
 ProtSocialHub  
 Protpittayapayat School Student Network  
 Dek-wit-2 of Protpittayapayat School 

Schools in Bangkok
Educational institutions established in 1949
1949 establishments in Thailand
Lat Krabang district